Johann August Apel (17 September 1771 – 9 August 1816) was a German writer and jurist. Apel was born and died in Leipzig.

Influence 
Die Jägerbraut was his version of "Der Freischütz", and it was published as the first story of the first volume of his and Friedrich Laun's Gespensterbuch horror anthology (1810). Friedrich Kind and Carl Maria von Weber drew on this version as the main source for the story of their opera Der Freischütz (1821). On recommendation of Carl von Brühl they abandoned their working title The Hunter's Bride to the better known title of Apel's tale.

Two of his other short stories ("Die Bilder der Ahnen" and "Die schwarze Kammer") were included in Jean-Baptiste Benoît Eyriès' Fantasmagoriana (1812), which was read by Lord Byron, Mary Shelley, Percy Bysshe Shelley, John William Polidori and Claire Clairmont at the Villa Diodati in Cologny, Switzerland during the Year Without a Summer, inspiring them to write their own ghost stories, including "The Vampyre" (1819), and Frankenstein (1823), which went on to shape the Gothic horror genre. "Die Bilder der Ahnen" (translated by Sarah Elizabeth Utterson in Tales of the Dead (1813) as "The Family Portraits") especially influenced Mary Shelley, who described it in her introduction to the 1831 edition of Frankenstein:

Works 
 Die Aitolier (1806)
 Gespensterbuch (1810–1815) with Friedrich Laun
 Wunderbuch volumes 1–2 (1815–1816) with Friedrich Laun
 Kalliroe (1806)
 Metrik (1814–1816)
 Polyidos (1805)

References

External links

 
 

1771 births
1816 deaths
People from the Electorate of Saxony
Jurists from Saxony
19th-century German novelists
Writers from Leipzig
German male novelists
19th-century German male writers
19th-century German writers
19th-century German jurists
People educated at the St. Thomas School, Leipzig